The Villain in Black is the second album by rapper MC Ren, released April 9, 1996, on Ruthless Records and distributed by Relativity Records.

Background
After the release and success of his critically acclaimed debut studio album Shock of the Hour in late 1993, MC Ren immediately began working on his sophomore album. The deaths of DJ Train and Eazy-E would however prove to be a huge setback and Ren stepped off the scene for a while. Meanwhile, he continued his work with the Nation of Islam, and visited Egypt in mid-1995. Following his return from Egypt, MC Ren continued to work on his album, this time however scrapping all the material he recorded with DJ Train. Enlisting Cold 187um and Dr. Jam to produce his album, Ren began recording new material.

Content

Lyrics 
While making The Villain in Black, MC Ren was closely affiliated with the Nation of Islam, which had a large impact on the some parts of the album's content. Khalid Muhammad appeared in the track "Muhammad Speaks," where he spoke about the history of the rights of African-Americans. He also made an appearance on the closing track "Bring It On".

Production 
The majority of the album's production was handled by Cold 187um of Above the Law and Dr. Jam. It also features production by Madness 4 Real and Big Jessie.

Album title 
The album titles is a reference to MC Ren's nickname, The Villain.

Singles 
Two singles were released from the album: "Mad Scientist" and "Keep It Real".

Release and reception

Critical reception

Commercial performance 
The album debuted number 31 on Billboard 200, with the first-week sales of 31,000 copies.

Track listing

Personnel 
 Harold Moore Jr. - Spoken word
 Gregory Fernan Hutchinson - Production, lyrics, vocals 
 Lorenzo Jerald Patterson - Primary artist, lyrics, vocals
 Big Rocc, KMG The Illustrator, Triggerman - Guest vocals
 Dr. Jam, Big Jessie Willard, Madness 4 Real - Additional production

Charts

Album

Singles

References 

MC Ren albums
1996 albums
Ruthless Records albums
Relativity Records albums
G-funk albums